Chuanxing Township is a rural township in Yanling County, Hunan Province, People's Republic of China.

Cityscape
The township is divided into 10 villages, the following areas: Donghe Village, Huangdong Village, Tongmu Village, Xinsheng Village, Gaolu Village, Chuanxing Village, Yantan Village, Nanping Village, Shuilong Village, and Changwang Village.

References

External links

Divisions of Yanling County